Capys bamendanus, the Cameroon protea playboy, is a butterfly in the family Lycaenidae. It is found in central Cameroon.

References

Endemic fauna of Cameroon
Butterflies described in 1909
Capys (butterfly)